Langar Makhdoom is a village of Chiniot District in Punjab, Pakistan.

References
Village Langar Makhdoom is the First village of Tehsil Lalian District Chiniot where the boundary started. The Village Langar Makhdoom QH (Qanoongo Halqa) has the population of 52,578 with literacy rate of 43.30% of All Genders. Total population is 99.85% Muslim 0.15% Non- Muslim. The area of This Village  is 39696 Acres. 4.533 People has their ages above from 60 Year and old according to  Punjab Population Report 2017. Village has 01 in No Govt High School,01 Middle School for girls,02 Primary Schools, 01 in number Basic Health Unit with Good maternity Services and 01 in number Veterinary Hospital. The village has 01 Jama Masjid named Masjid Burhan ud din in the memory of Makhdoom Burhan Ud Din the big saint(Sufi or Peer) of the area. Mostly Living casts are

Makhdoom, Gondal, Rehan, Khokhar, Qazi, Arain, Ranjha, Bhatti(Kumhaar, Lohaar, Tirkhan,Pawli,Mochi,Sonaar,Bar,Dhabbay),Muslim Shaikh,Shaikh, Gujjar, Awan, Muhajir,Lak,Taili,Tonday, etc. The village is surrounded by Agricultural forms. The majority is associated with the profession of agriculture but a some of them are also in Politics , Military and civil services, such as police, irrigation wapda communication and works health construction business education and judiciary, as well as a few working abroad mainly in the United States, Canada, Saudi Arabia, Netherlands, Italy, Spain and the United Kingdom. Although they are working in these countries but majority of them remain illiterate and backwards. The village produce a huge amount of Wheat, Rice, Sugarcane, Citrus Fruit, Watermelons and Vegetables. The Village has Moderated sewerage system but in near future very difficulties will occur. Mostly the structure is old like street, waste areas, sewerage line are modified when needed. Peoples are very friendly and helping improving their life standards to live better life.

Populated places in Sargodha District